The 2009 Delray Beach International Tennis Championships was a men's tennis tournament played on outdoor hard courts. It was the 17th edition of the Delray Beach International Tennis Championships, and was part of the International Series of the 2009 ATP Tour. It took place at the Delray Beach Tennis Center in Delray Beach, Florida, United States, from February 23 through March 1, 2009.

The field was headlined by ATP No. 21 and San Jose finalist Mardy Fish, Auckland finalist Sam Querrey, and 2008 Moscow titlist Igor Kunitsyn. Other top seeds competing were Ernests Gulbis, Steve Darcis, Florent Serra, Jérémy Chardy and Lu Yen-hsun.

First-seeded Mardy Fish won the singles title.

ATP entrants

Seeds 

Rankings as of February 23, 2009.

Other entrants 
The following players received wildcards into the main draw:
 Sam Querrey
 Lleyton Hewitt
 Evan King
The following players received a special exempt into the main draw:
 Dudi Sela
The following players received entry from the qualifying draw:
 Evgeny Korolev
 Frank Dancevic
 Taylor Dent
 Ryan Sweeting

Finals

Singles 

 Mardy Fish defeated  Evgeny Korolev 7–5, 6–3
 It was Fish's first singles title of the year and 3rd of his career.

Doubles 

 Bob Bryan /  Mike Bryan defeated  Marcelo Melo /  André Sá, 6–4, 6–4

References

External links 

Official website
Singles draw
Doubles draw
Qualifying Singles draw

 
Delray Beach
Delray Beach International Tennis Championships
Delray Beach International Tennis Championships
Delray Beach International Tennis Championships
Delray Beach International Tennis Championships
Delray Beach Open